Norman Campbell (4 March 1919 – 9 January 1981) was an Australian rules footballer who played with Collingwood in the Victorian Football League (VFL).

Campbell was a wingman for Collingwood in the 1939 VFL Grand Final, which they lost to Melbourne. His brother Colin played with him at the club in 1940 and 1941.

References

References

External links
 Norm Campbell, at ''The VFA Project.

1919 births
1981 deaths
Australian rules footballers from Melbourne
Australian Rules footballers: place kick exponents
Collingwood Football Club players
Preston Football Club (VFA) players
People from Thornbury, Victoria